Janice Cayman (born 12 October 1988) is a Belgian professional footballer who plays as an attacking midfielder for Olympique Lyonnais in the D1 Féminine.

Career
Cayman previously played for Montpellier HSC and FCF Juvisy in the French First Division, OH Leuven and DVC Eva's Tienen in the Belgian First Division and Florida State Seminoles in the NCAA, also playing the European Cup with Tienen.

She is a member of the Belgium national team and scored four goals during their appearance at the 2016 Algarve Cup, making her top scorer of that tournament. On 12 November 2019, Cayman played her 100th match for Belgium against Lithuania.

Career statistics
Scores and results list Belgium's goal tally first, score column indicates score after each Cayman goal.

Honours
Pali Blues
 USL W-League: 2009

Western New York Flash
 NWSL: 2016

References

External links
 
 
 Player French football stats  at footofeminin.fr
 
 Janice Cayman Interview

1988 births
Living people
Belgian women's footballers
Belgium women's youth international footballers
Belgium women's international footballers
Belgian expatriate footballers
Paris FC (women) players
Expatriate women's footballers in France
Belgian expatriate sportspeople in France
Pali Blues players
USL W-League (1995–2015) players
Expatriate women's soccer players in the United States
Belgian expatriate sportspeople in the United States
Women's association football midfielders
Women's association football forwards
Florida State Seminoles women's soccer players
People from Brasschaat
Western New York Flash players
National Women's Soccer League players
Olympique Lyonnais Féminin players
Montpellier HSC (women) players
Division 1 Féminine players
Oud-Heverlee Leuven (women) players
FIFA Century Club
Footballers from Antwerp Province
UEFA Women's Euro 2022 players
UEFA Women's Euro 2017 players